Emilia Ingrid Maria Andersson Ramboldt  (born 31 August 1988) is a Swedish ice hockey defenceman. She was a member of the Swedish national team for twelve seasons, playing in eight IIHF Women's World Championships and at the Winter Olympics in 2010, 2014, and 2018. Ramboldt was named Riksserien Player of the Year for the 2014–15 season.

Playing career
Ramboldt was born 31 August 1988 in Sollentuna, a municipality bordering Stockholm, in Stockholm County, Sweden. As a child, she was often at the ice rink because three of her brothers played hockey and she recalls asking her mother if she could start figure skating since they were already at the rink all the time but her mother said no and encouraged her to take up ice hockey instead. Her youth club was Gillbo IF, the same club as future NHLer Patric Hörnqvist, and though they were never on the same team due to their nearly two-year age difference, the two often played one another in pick-up games at the Gillbo ice rink along with other neighborhood kids, including Ramboldt's younger brothers.

NCAA
In her freshman season with the Minnesota State Mavericks, Andersson compiled 18 points, of which, nine came through the power play. Among freshmen, she was the team leader in scoring, and second overall among all blueliners on the club.

Personal life
Emilia Andersson married Anna Ramboldt in Linköping, Sweden, in June 2015. Originally from Minnesota, Anna Rambldt attended Saint Mary's University of Minnesota, where she played as an infielder with the school's fastpitch softball team and studied criminal justice. The two were introduced by a mutual friend in 2012 and began dating soon thereafter. Their son Walter was born in 2017.

International play
Andersson competed in the Swedish Champion Cup. She was part of a first-place finish in 2006–07 and a second-place finish in 2007–08, respectively.

She was on the Sweden roster for the 4 Nations Tournament in December 2015.

Career stats

Sweden

NCAA

Awards and honors
2008–09 Minnesota State Mavericks Rookie of the Year

References

External links

Swedish Olympic Committee – Emilia Andersson 

1988 births
Living people
AIK Hockey Dam players
Ice hockey players at the 2010 Winter Olympics
Ice hockey players at the 2014 Winter Olympics
Ice hockey players at the 2018 Winter Olympics
Lesbian sportswomen
Swedish LGBT sportspeople
LGBT ice hockey players
Linköping HC Dam players
Minnesota State Mavericks women's ice hockey players
Olympic ice hockey players of Sweden
Ice hockey people from Stockholm
Swedish women's ice hockey defencemen
Swedish expatriate ice hockey players in the United States
People from Sollentuna Municipality
Minnesota State University, Mankato alumni